This article lists Diocesan Bishops and Archbishops in the Church of England, the Church in Wales, the Scottish Episcopal Church and the Church of Ireland.

In the Church of England
Province of Canterbury

Archbishop of Canterbury
Bishop of London
Bishop of Winchester
Bishop of Bath and Wells
Bishop of Birmingham
Bishop of Bristol
Bishop of Chelmsford
Bishop of Chichester
Bishop of Coventry
Bishop of Derby
Bishop of Ely
Bishop of Exeter
Bishop of Gibraltar in Europe
Bishop of Gloucester
Bishop of Guildford
Bishop of Hereford
Bishop of Leicester
Bishop of Lichfield
Bishop of Lincoln
Bishop of Norwich
Bishop of Oxford
Bishop of Peterborough
Bishop of Portsmouth
Bishop of Rochester
Bishop of Salisbury
Bishop of Southwark
Bishop of St Albans
Bishop of St Edmundsbury & Ipswich
Bishop of Truro
Bishop of Worcester

Province of York

Archbishop of York
Bishop of Durham
Bishop of Blackburn
Bishop of Carlisle
Bishop of Chester
Bishop of Liverpool
Bishop of Leeds
Bishop of Manchester
Bishop of Newcastle
Bishop of Sheffield
Bishop of Sodor and Man
Bishop of Southwell and Nottingham

In the Church in Wales

Archbishop of Wales
Bishop of Bangor
Bishop of Llandaff
Bishop of Monmouth
Bishop of St Asaph
Bishop of St David's
Bishop of Swansea and Brecon

In the Scottish Episcopal Church

Primus of the Scottish Episcopal Church
Bishop of Aberdeen and Orkney
Bishop of Argyll and the Isles
Bishop of Brechin
Bishop of Edinburgh
Bishop of Glasgow and Galloway
Bishop of Moray, Ross and Caithness
Bishop of St Andrews, Dunkeld and Dunblane

In the Church of Ireland
Province of Armagh

Archbishop of Armagh
Bishop of Clogher
Bishop of Connor
Bishop of Derry and Raphoe
Bishop of Down and Dromore
Bishop of Kilmore, Elphin and Ardagh

Province of Dublin

Archbishop of Dublin
Bishop of Cashel and Ossory
Bishop of Cork, Cloyne and Ross
 Bishop of Tuam, Limerick and Killaloe 
Bishop of Meath and Kildare

See also
Religion in the United Kingdom
List of Church of England dioceses
List of Anglican dioceses in the United Kingdom and Ireland

Anglicanism in the United Kingdom
Anglican diocesan bishops in Britain and Ireland
Britain
Lists of Anglican bishops and archbishops
Anglican diocesan bishops